Intrinsic viscosity  is a measure of a solute's contribution to the viscosity  of a solution. It should not be confused with inherent viscosity, which is the ratio of the natural logarithm of the relative viscosity to the mass concentration of the polymer.

Intrinsic viscosity is defined as

As defined here, the intrinsic viscosity  is a dimensionless number. When the solute particles are rigid spheres at infinite dilution, the intrinsic viscosity equals , as shown first by Albert Einstein.

In practical settings,  is usually solute mass concentration (c, g/dL), and the units of intrinsic viscosity  are deciliters per gram (dL/g), otherwise known as inverse concentration.

Formulae for rigid spheroids

Generalizing from spheres to spheroids with an axial semiaxis  (i.e., the semiaxis of revolution) and equatorial semiaxes , the intrinsic viscosity can be written

where the constants are defined

The  coefficients are the Jeffery functions

General ellipsoidal formulae

Frequency dependence

The intrinsic viscosity formula may also be generalized to include a frequency dependence.

Applications

The intrinsic viscosity is very sensitive to the axial ratio of spheroids, especially of prolate spheroids.  For example, the intrinsic viscosity can provide rough estimates of the number of subunits in a protein fiber composed of a helical array of proteins such as tubulin.  More generally, intrinsic viscosity can be used to assay quaternary structure.  In polymer chemistry intrinsic viscosity is related to molar mass through the Mark–Houwink equation. A practical method for the determination of intrinsic viscosity is with a Ubbelohde viscometer.

References

 
 
 
 
 

Fluid dynamics
Viscosity